Elisa Fleischmann (born 7 September 1985) from Valdidentro is an Italian ski mountaineer. She is born in Sondalo and has been member of the national team since 2007.

Selected results 
 2007:
 1st, Italian Championship vertical race
 2nd, Pierra Menta "espoirs" class race (together with Anne Claire Estubier)
 2nd, European Championship vertical race ("espoirs" class)
 3rd, European Championship horizontal race
 4th, European Championship combination ranking
 5th, European Championship team race (together with Tamara Lunger)
 6th, European Championship single race
 10th, European Championship vertical race
 2008:
 1st, Pierra Menta "espoirs" class race (together with Tamara Lunger)
 3rd, Sellaronda Skimarathon (together with Tamara Lunger)
 2nd, World Championship relay race (together with Gloriana Pellissier, Francesca Martinelli and Roberta Pedranzini)

External links 
 Elisa Fleischmann at skimountaineering.org

References 

1985 births
Living people
Italian female ski mountaineers
People from Sondalo
Italian female cross-country skiers
Sportspeople from the Province of Sondrio